

374001–374100 

|-bgcolor=#f2f2f2
| colspan=4 align=center | 
|}

374101–374200 

|-bgcolor=#f2f2f2
| colspan=4 align=center | 
|}

374201–374300 

|-bgcolor=#f2f2f2
| colspan=4 align=center | 
|}

374301–374400 

|-id=338
| 374338 Fontana ||  || Francesco Fontana (c.1585–1656) was an Italian astronomer and telescope maker. || 
|-id=354
| 374354 Pesquet ||  || Thomas Pesquet (born 1978) is a French aerospace engineer, pilot and European Space Agency astronaut. From November 2016 to June 2017, Pesquet was part of Expedition 50 and Expedition 51 as a flight engineer aboard the International Space Station. || 
|}

374401–374500 

|-bgcolor=#f2f2f2
| colspan=4 align=center | 
|}

374501–374600 

|-bgcolor=#f2f2f2
| colspan=4 align=center | 
|}

374601–374700 

|-bgcolor=#f2f2f2
| colspan=4 align=center | 
|}

374701–374800 

|-id=710
| 374710 ʻOʻo ||  || The ʻOʻo was a genus of birds native to the islands of Hawaiʻi. These birds nested in tree cavities and had black plumage. The last recording of the song of the ʻOʻo was in 1987 on Kauaʻi, and it is likely extinct on all islands. || 
|-id=715
| 374715 Dimpourbaix ||  || Dimitri Pourbaix (1969–2021) was a Belgian astronomer, specialized in astrometry, who spearheaded the Belgian contribution to the Gaia space observatory. || 
|}

374801–374900 

|-id=848
| 374848 Arturomalignani || 2006 VK || Arturo Malignani (1865–1939) was an Italian inventor from Friuli. Interested in numerous sectors of industry and astronomy, he obtained patents on incandescent lamps, which were later sold to Thomas Edison. || 
|}

374901–375000 

|-bgcolor=#f2f2f2
| colspan=4 align=center | 
|}

References 

374001-375000